Leganano usually refers to the Italian town and commune in north-western Milan

It may also refer to:
 A.C. Legnano, an Italian association football club based in Legnano
 Battle of Legnano, fought on 29 May 1176 between the forces of the Holy Roman Empire and the Lombard League.
 Legnano (cycling team), an Italian professional cycling team active from 1906 to 1966
 58th Infantry Division Legnano, an Infantry Division of the Royal Italian Army during the Second World War
 Legnano Mechanized Brigade, a mechanized brigade of the Italian Army, 1975 - 1997
 Legnano Basket Knights, an Italian professional basketball club based in Legnano